"Perish" is the first single from the fourth studio album Gift by alternative rock band Curve. It was released on 28 October 2002 only on CD format and it reached #168 in the UK singles chart.

This single includes a radio version of the "Perish", the album track "Want More Need Less" from Gift and a reworked version of "Recovery" from Pink Girl With the Blues/Come Clean.

Track listing
"Perish" – 3:54
"Want More Need Less" – 4:35
"Recovery" – 4:59

Credits
 Written by Toni Halliday and Dean Garcia
 Toni Halliday: words, vocals and guitar noise
 Dean Garcia: bass, guitar, programming and noise
 Produced, engineered, recorded by Curve and Ben Grosse at Todal Studios
 Mixed by Ben Grosse at The Mix Room Los Angeles
 Featuring Kevin Shields: more guitar on tracks 1 & 2
 Monti: more drums on tracks 1 & 2
 Mastered by Kevin Metcallfe at Soundmasters London
 Design: Curve and Paul Agar

References

2002 singles
Curve (band) songs
2001 songs
Songs written by Dean Garcia
Songs written by Toni Halliday